Vishvamanava refers to the Hindu philosophical concept of a universal man. It has been discussed by a number of significant philosophers such as Rabindranath Tagore.

References

Hindu philosophy

Sanskrit words and phrases